Monimpébougou is a village and rural commune in the Cercle of Macina in the Ségou Region of southern-central Mali. The commune covers an area of approximately 2,249  square kilometers and includes 33 villages. In the 2009 census the commune had a population of 32,899.

References

External links
.

Communes of Ségou Region